The 1956 Arizona Wildcats football team represented the University of Arizona in the Border Conference during the 1956 NCAA University Division football season.  In their fifth and final season under head coach Warren B. Woodson, the Wildcats compiled a 4–6 record (1–2 against Border opponents) and were outscored by their opponents, 182 to 180. The team captains were Paul Hatcher and Art Luppino.  The team played its home games in Arizona Stadium in Tucson, Arizona.

The team's statistical leaders included Ralph Hunsaker with 823 passing yards, Sal Gonzalez with 337 rushing yards, and Eddie Sine with 163 receiving yards.

Schedule

References

Arizona
Arizona Wildcats football seasons
Arizona Wildcats football